Category 6 is the sixth studio album by American miami bass producer DJ Laz. It was released on July 29, 2008, via VIP Music and Federal Distribution. The album features guest appearances from Flo-Rida, Rick Ross, T-Pain, and Mims among others. The album peaked at number 49 on the Top R&B/Hip-Hop Albums chart, number 23 on the Top Rap Albums chart, and number 18 on the Heatseekers Albums chart. It spawned the only single, "Move Shake Drop", which also made it to the Billboard charts.

Track listing

Personnel 

 Lazaro Mendez – main artist, producer
 Danny "Styles" Schofield – producer, engineer, mixing
 Winston Thomas – producer, engineer, mixing
 Lionel "Deadbeat" De La O – producer, engineer
 Luis Alejandro Diaz – producer
 Hugo Andres Diaz – producer
 Tha Otherz – producer
 Colin Michaels – engineer, mixing
 Carla Humphries – engineer
 Marcus Trotman – engineer
 Jose Blanco – mastering
 Elijah – featured artist (tracks: 4, 11)
 William Leonard Roberts II – featured artist (track 1)
 Wallace Whigfield Wilson – featured artist (track 9)
 Shawn Tapiwa Mims – featured artist (track 4)
 Tramar Lacel Dillard – featured artist (track 3)
 Faheem Rashad Najm – featured artist (track 8)
 Jean-Carlos Casely – featured artist (track 3)
 Charles Sweeting – featured artist (track 12)
 Dirt E Red – featured artist (track 12)
 J-Perk – featured artist (track 12)
 Odd Ballaz – featured artist (track 4)
 Sito Rocks – featured artist (track 10)
 U.B. – featured artist (track 12)
 Yungen – featured artist (track 7)

Charts

References

External links 

2008 albums
Hip hop albums by American artists
Miami bass albums